KFTW may refer to:

 KFTW-LP, a defunct low-power radio station (97.5 FM) formerly licensed to serve Fort Worth, Texas, United States
 Fort Worth Meacham International Airport (ICAO code KFTW)